Unnudan is a 1998 Indian Tamil-language romantic drama film directed by R. Balu and produced by Aroma Mani. The film featured Murali alongside Kausalya, while Vivek and Manivannan play supporting roles. The project saw the director and cast come together after the success of their previous film Kaalamellam Kadhal Vaazhga (1997).  The film, which had music composed by Deva, opened in October 1998 to mixed reviews.

Plot
Santhosh runs a medical store along with his uncle and he lives with his mother. Gowri is a medical student in government hospital living with her grandfather, both become friends and they love to be in company of each other. santhosh falls for gowri but is unable to express his feelings for her likewise gowri falls for him but failed to reach him out through her letter. gowri's grandfather is supportive to her love and tells her that he will help her out and he promises to tell santhosh about this but unfortunately he passes away. As gowri completed her final exam her parents are ready to take her back to cochin which is her home town. A letter she sends before reaches his hands by that time and he rushes to railway station to meet her but train moves but a patient in train gets abdominal pain due to pregnancy and gowri is called in for a treatment, she treats the girl and a boy child is born which she names as 'santhosh'. As santhosh reaches her that time and they both join and gets permission from her parents to be united forever.

Cast

Murali as Santhosh
Kausalya as Gowri
Manivannan as Santhosh's uncle
Vivek as Santhosh's friend
Chinni Jayanth as Madhesh
Charle as Azhagu Sundaram
Pandu as Venkatesh
Madhan Bob
Sumithra as Santhosh"s mother
Kovai Sarala as Thayamma
Bindu Panicker 
Alphonsa as Special appearance
Pandiyan as Guest appearance

Soundtrack
Lyrics were written by Vairamuthu.

Release
The film had a low key release compared to the team's previous venture Kaalamellam Kadhal Vaazhga (1997) and received average reviews from critics.

A critic from Dinakaran noted "the one great highlight among all the plus points in the film is the excellent cinematography of Thangar Bachann! Especially the natural sceneries of Kerala and the songs' scenic backgrounds fill our eyes with aesthetic extravaganza!".

References

1998 films
1990s Tamil-language films